Fusako (written:  or ) is a feminine Japanese given name. Notable people with the name include:

, Japanese diver
, Japanese princess
, Japanese photographer
, Japanese diver
, Japanese manga artist
, Japanese racewalker
, Japanese kidnapping victim
, Japanese communist
, Japanese empress consort
, Japanese writer

Japanese feminine given names